The qualification matches for Group 2 of the European zone (UEFA) of the 1994 FIFA World Cup qualification tournament took place between September 1992 and November 1993. The teams competed on a home-and-away basis with the winner and runner-up claiming 2 of the 12 spots in the final tournament allocated to the European zone. The group consisted of England, Netherlands, Norway, Poland, San Marino, and Turkey.

Standings

Results

Goal scorers

7 goals

 David Platt

6 goals

 Peter van Vossen

5 goals

 Ian Wright
 Dennis Bergkamp
 Kjetil Rekdal

4 goals

 Paul Gascoigne

3 goals

 Les Ferdinand
 John Bosman
 Ronald de Boer
 Jostein Flo
 Gunnar Halle
 Gøran Sørloth
 Marek Leśniak
 Feyyaz Uçar
 Hakan Şükür

2 goals

 Paul Ince
 Stuart Pearce
 John de Wolf
 Wim Jonk
 Ronald Koeman
 Rob Witschge
 Lars Bohinen
 Jan Åge Fjørtoft
 Mini Jakobsen
 Roger Nilsen
 Wojciech Kowalczyk
 Ertuğrul Sağlam

1 goal

 John Barnes
 Carlton Palmer
 Alan Shearer
 Ruud Gullit
 Marc Overmars
 John van den Brom
 Ronny Johnsen
 Oyvind Leonhardsen
 Erik Mykland
 Dariusz Adamczuk
 Marek Koźmiński
 Jan Furtok
 Tomasz Wałdoch
 Krzysztof Warzycha
 Davide Gualtieri
 Nicola Bacciocchi
 Bülent Korkmaz
 Hami Mandıralı
 Orhan Çıkırıkçı

1 own goal

 Nicola Bacciocchi (playing against the Netherlands)

See also
An Impossible Job

Notes

External links
Group 2 Detailed Results at RSSSF

2
1992–93 in English football
Qual
1993 in Norwegian football
Qual
1992–93 in Dutch football
Qual
1992–93 in Polish football
1993–94 in Polish football
1992–93 in Turkish football
1993–94 in Turkish football
1992–93 in San Marino football
1993–94 in San Marino football